The middle meningeal nerve (meningeal or dural branch) is given off from the maxillary nerve (CN V2) directly after its origin from the trigeminal ganglion, before CN V2 enters the foramen rotundum.

It accompanies the middle meningeal artery and vein as the artery and vein enter the cranium through the foramen spinosum and supplies the dura mater.

Additional images

References 

Maxillary nerve